Medical Examiner Dr. Qin is a 2016 Chinese streaming television series adapted from the novel The Eleventh Finger (Chinese: 第十一根手指) by Qin Ming. It follows an investigative team consisting of medical examiner Qin Ming, his assistant Li Dabao and police officer Lin Tao as they solve mysterious criminal cases.

Produced by Beijing Bojitianjuan Film and TV, the series premiered in October 2016 on the streaming service Sohu TV. A second season ran in April 2017 and the third was broadcast in 2018.

Cast
Zhang Ruoyun as Qin Ming (S1)
Jiao Junyan as Li Dabao (S1)
Li Xian as Lin Tao (S1)

Reception
The series is one of the most successful network drama on Sohu TV, with 1.5 billion views. Considered as a pioneer of its genre, the series helped shed light on the profession of a forensic doctor by delving into their hardships and professional working attitudes. It has been praised for its bold plots, tense storyline and good-looking performers. The series was also ranked as one of the top 10 web dramas at the 2016 ENAwards.

Awards and nominations

References

External links
 

2016 Chinese television series debuts
Chinese crime television series
Mandarin-language television shows
Police procedural television series
2016 web series debuts
Chinese web series
Sohu original programming